Sinupharus is a genus of bivalves, belonging to the family Pharidae.

Species
 Sinupharus africanus (Chenu, 1843)
 Sinupharus bernardi Cosel, 1993
 Sinupharus combieri (Fischer-Piette & Nicklès, 1946)
 Sinupharus curtus Cosel, 1993
 Sinupharus galatheae Cosel, 1993

References

 Cosel R. von (1993). The razor shells of the eastern Atlantic. Part 1: Solenidae and Pharidae I (Bivalvia: Solenacea). Archiv für Molluskenkunde 122 (Zilch Festschrift): 207-321

External links
  Gofas, S.; Le Renard, J.; Bouchet, P. (2001). Mollusca. in: Costello, M.J. et al. (eds), European Register of Marine Species: a check-list of the marine species in Europe and a bibliography of guides to their identification. Patrimoines Naturels. 50: 180-213

Pharidae
Bivalve genera